A number of ships were named Housatonic, including:

, an American cargo ship torpedoed and sunk in 1917
, a British tanker wrecked in 1908
, a British tanker sunk by aircraft bombing in 1941

See also
 , several United States Navy vessels

Ship names